Darbid-e Sofla (also Romanized as Dārbīd-e Soflá; also known as Dārbīd-e Pā’īn and Bīzhanvand-e Soflá) is a village in Qalayi Rural District, Firuzabad District, Selseleh County, Lorestan Province, Iran. At the 2006 census, its population was 103, in 24 families.

References 

Towns and villages in Selseleh County